La Côte-d'Aime (literally The Slope of Aime) is a former commune in the Savoie department in the Auvergne-Rhône-Alpes region in south-eastern France. On 1 January 2016, it was merged into the new commune of La Plagne Tarentaise.

It lies in the heart of the Tarentaise valley.

See also
Communes of the Savoie department

References

External links

 Official site

Former communes of Savoie